Archinemapogon ussuriensis is a moth of the family Tineidae. It found in the Russian Far East.

References

Moths described in 1962
Nemapogoninae
Taxa named by Aleksei Konstantinovich Zagulyaev